"Better Your Heart Than Mine" is a song recorded by American country music artist Trisha Yearwood.  It was released in February 1994 as the second single from the album The Song Remembers When.  The song reached #21 on the Billboard Hot Country Singles & Tracks chart.  The song was written by Lisa Angelle and Andrew Gold.

Chart performance

References

1994 singles
1993 songs
Trisha Yearwood songs
Songs written by Andrew Gold
Songs written by Lisa Angelle
Song recordings produced by Garth Fundis
MCA Records singles